Masada: Zayin, also known as ז or Masada 7, is a 1996 album by American composer and saxophonist John Zorn and released on the Japanese DIW label.    It is the seventh album of Masada recordings.

Reception
The Allmusic review by Don Snowden awarded the album 3 stars stating "Masada's seventh volume sounds almost like an odds-and-sods collection. It's a more fragmentary and disparate disc that doesn't have much musical middle ground -- the extremes between the group's atonal free improv bursts and its more melodic or atmospheric pieces are very pronounced... The music flies all over the map and it sounds like Masada is just wrapping up loose ends or spewing out material based on Zorn's concepts that could have stayed out in the woodshed. Although it's good to hear the group taking some different roads, this is a minor entry in its catalog".

Track listing
All compositions by John Zorn.
 "Shevet" – 7:58
 "Hath-Arob" – 3:24
 "Mahshav" – 6:16
 "Shamor" – 5:09
 "Bacharach" – 1:24
 "Otiot" – 3:27
 "Nevuah" – 8:22
 "Kedem" – 9:55
 "Zemer" – 2:14
 "Evel" – 5:35
 "Tekufah" – 6:59
Recorded at the Power Station, New York City on April 16, 1996

Personnel 
John Zorn – alto saxophone
Dave Douglas – trumpet
Greg Cohen – bass
Joey Baron – drums

References

1996 albums
Masada (band) albums
Albums produced by John Zorn
DIW Records albums